Vladimir Leitner (born 28 June 1974) is a  retired Slovak football defender who last played for the Slovak Corgoň Liga club MŠK Žilina. Leitner played 25 international games for Slovakia and scored one goal.

Honours

Trnava
Slovak Cup: 1998
Super Cup: 1998

Teplice
Czech Cup: 2003

Dukla
Slovak Cup: 2005

Žilina
Corgoň Liga: 2006–07, 2009–10
Super Cup: 2007, 2010

References

External links
 Official site 

1974 births
Living people
Slovak footballers
Czechoslovak footballers
Slovakia international footballers
Association football fullbacks
MŠK Žilina players
FC Spartak Trnava players
FK Teplice players
FK Dukla Banská Bystrica players
Expatriate footballers in the Czech Republic
Slovak expatriate sportspeople in the Czech Republic
Slovak expatriate footballers
Slovak Super Liga players
Czech First League players
Sportspeople from Žilina